

Women's 200 m Freestyle - Final

Women's 200 m Freestyle - Heats

Women's 200 m Freestyle - Heat 01

Women's 200 m Freestyle - Heat 02

Women's 200 m Freestyle - Heat 03

Women's 200 m Freestyle - Heat 04

200 metres freestyle
2006 in women's swimming